Late at Night is the thirteenth studio album by Billy Preston, released in 1979, and his debut for Motown Records.  It includes his hit duet with Syreeta Wright, "With You I'm Born Again", from the film Fast Break.

Track listing
"Give It Up, Hot" (Billy Preston, Ronnie Vann, Bruce Fisher)  – 5:59
"Late at Night" (Preston, Jesse Kirkland, Joe Greene)  – 4:49
"All I Wanted Was You" (Preston, Carol Connors)  – 4:43
"You" (Preston, Gloria Jones, Richard Jones)  – 4:25
"I Come to Rest in You" (Preston, Guy Finley)  – 3:52
"It Will Come in Time" (Preston)  – 4:57
"Lovely Lady" (Preston, Jack Ackerman)  – 3:52
"With You I'm Born Again" (David Shire, Carol Connors)  – 3:38
"Sock-It, Rocket" (Preston)  – 3:10

Personnel 
Billy Preston - piano, Hammond organ, synthesizer, guitar, vocals
David T. Walker, Paul Jackson Jr. - guitar
Chuck Rainey, Keni Burke, Robert Lee Hill - bass guitar
James Gadson, Ollie E. Brown - drums
Bobbye Hall - percussion
Bobby Keys - saxophone
Dorothy Ashby - harp
Gloria Jones - backing vocals
Richard Jones - backing vocals
Phyllis St. James - backing vocals
Bobby King - backing vocals
Bruce Fisher - backing vocals
Scherrie Payne - backing vocals
Maxayn Lewis - backing vocals
Jesse Kirkland - backing vocals
Joe Greene - backing vocals
Harry Bluestone - concertmaster
Syreeta Wright - vocals on "It Will Come in Time" and "With You I'm Born Again"
Billy Preston, David Blumberg, David Shire - arrangements
Technical
Suzanne DePasse, Tony Jones - executive producer
F. Byron Clark - co-producer, engineer, mixing
Ed Caraeff Studio - art direction, design, photography

References

Billy Preston albums
1979 albums
Albums produced by Billy Preston
Motown albums